Wedding in the Coral Sea is a 1944 Czech animated short film. It was written, animated and directed by a group of Czech cartoonists including Jiří Brdečka, Břetislav Pojar, Stanislav Látal and Jaroslav Doubrava in German-occupied Prague in Ateliér Filmových triků studio.

Plot
The plot involves the creatures of the sea preparing for the wedding of two fish.  When the fish bride is kidnapped by an octopus all the sea creatures must team up to defeat him and rescue the bride.

Production
German cartoonist Horst von Möllendorff was appointed as an official director, while his role in the making of the film was in fact minimal. The film was shot on Agfacolor film material.

See also
List of films made in the Third Reich

References

External links
 

1944 films
1944 animated films
1944 short films
1940s animated short films
Czechoslovak animated short films
Films of Nazi Germany
Czech animated short films
German animated short films
Animated films about fish
Films about kidnapping
Films about weddings
Films directed by Jiří Brdečka
Films directed by Břetislav Pojar
Films directed by Stanislav Látal
Films directed by Horst von Möllendorff
Films with underwater settings
Films with screenplays by Horst von Möllendorff